Miramonte High School is a public high school located in Orinda, California, United States. It is part of the Acalanes Union High School District. The school has a college-preparatory program, with 15 Advanced Placement courses offered.

History 
Miramonte was founded in 1955.

Miramonte football recorded their first NCS CIF championship in 1981, defeating San Lorenzo 23–7 in the Oakland Coliseum.

In 1972 & 1973, The Miramonte Matador Football team won the Foothill Athletic League Championship both years. The 1973 team went on to beat Antioch High School in the "Turkey Bowl" to end the bowl season as the East Bay Area's #1 Ranked Championship Football Team.  The 1972 Miramonte team also played against Antioch the previous year in the Turkey Bowl and lost.

In 1983 the Miramonte Matadors, known as the Mats, were voted CIF State Champions in all divisions after defeating Cardinal Newman High School on December 3, 1983, at Oakland–Alameda County Coliseum in the NCS 2A Championship game. The Mats were also NCS 2A South Champions and FAL Champions.

In 1997 the Mats again won the NCS 2A Championship after defeating Granada High School in the championship game at the Oakland Coliseum. The Mats also won NCS 2A titles in 1998, 2000, 2001 and 2003 in their victory over San Lorenzo in a rematch of their 1981 championship game.

In 2013, after finishing 2nd in the DFAL, the Mats defeated Tennyson, Northgate and number two-seeded Clayton Valley Charter to reach the championship at Rancho Cotate High School against 13–0 Casa Grande. In an exciting game, Miramonte scored two touchdowns in the last two minutes to win their 8th NCS football championship, 42–28 to finish 12–2 on the season.

In 2008–09, Miramonte's water polo team was named "2008-09 ESPN RISE Magazine Boys' Team of the Year" (includes all sports). Since 1967 the team has won 15 NOR CAL championships and 26 League Championships. The so-called "Dream Team" were the California State Champions that year.

In 2012, U.S. News & World Report ranked Miramonte High School as #21 in California and #126 in the United States. In 2021, Miramonte is now ranked 571 nationally, and it slipped from the top school in the county to third place.

As of March 2014, Miramonte ranks 11th on the Los Angeles Times California Schools Guide Top Average SAT Scores list.

Demographics
Total students: 1283
Students by gender:
     55% female
     45% male
Students by ethnicity
      2.2% Black/African American
    7.5 % Hispanic
     25% Asian
     65% White/Caucasian 
Student to teacher ratio: 21:1

Census Day Enrollment	
2017-18	2018-19	2019-20	2020-21	2021-22
Total	1,316	1,286	1,236	1,174	1,183

Notable alumni 

 Bryan Barker, NFL player, Class of 1982
 Chris Bauer, film, TV and stage actor, Class of 1984
 Drew Bennett, NFL player
 Kirsten Costas, murder victim
 Ken Dorsey, NFL quarterback and coach
Drew Anderson, NFL quarterback 
 Paul Hackett, former college football head coach, NFL assistant coach
 Valerie Henderson, professional soccer player
 Sabrina Ionescu, WNBA player
 Brett Jackson, former professional baseball player
 Drew Jackson, professional baseball player
 Mike MacDonald, rugby player
 Heather Petri, Olympic water polo medalist
 Luke Sassano, soccer player
 Nicolle Wallace (née Devenish), political commentator, former White House Communications Director

References

External links
 

High schools in Contra Costa County, California
Orinda, California
Public high schools in California
Educational institutions established in 1955
1955 establishments in California